Joshua Euria Carlton (born February 26, 1999) is an American professional basketball player for Le Mans of the French Pro A. He played college basketball for the UConn Huskies and the Houston Cougars.

High school career
Carlton played his freshman season at South Central High School in Winterville, North Carolina. His family moved to the Washington, D.C. area after his sophomore season and he enrolled at DeMatha Catholic High School. Carlton befriended teammate and future NBA player Markelle Fultz at DeMatha. Carlton averaged 11.1 points, 11.7 rebounds, and 3.2 blocks per game and helped the team to a 33–5 record as a junior. As a senior, after Fultz graduated, Carlton averaged 14.4 points, 11.4 rebounds, and 3.1 blocks per game on a 25–10 record. In September 2016, he committed to playing college basketball for UConn over offers from Cincinnati, USC, Providence, Maryland and Kansas State.

College career
As a freshman, Carlton averaged 4.4 points and 3.7 rebounds per game. He averaged nine points and 6.2 rebounds per game as a sophomore, earning AAC Most Improved Player honors. Carlton averaged 7.8 points and 6.1 rebounds per game as a junior. During his senior season, he lost his starting center role to Adama Sanogo and posted 3.5 points and 3.7 rebounds per game. Following the season, Carlton took advantage of the additional season of eligibility granted by the NCAA due to the COVID-19 pandemic and entered the transfer portal, ultimately transferring to Houston over East Carolina, Pittsburgh and Wake Forest. He focused on losing weight and received more playing time due to injuries to Marcus Sasser and Tramon Mark. On January 5, 2022, Carlton scored a career-high 30 points and had 11 rebounds in a 83–66 win over South Florida. He was named to the First Team All-AAC.

Professional career
On August 6, 2022, Carlton signed with Le Mans of the French Pro A.

Career statistics

College

|-
| style="text-align:left;"| 2017–18
| style="text-align:left;"| UConn
| 32 || 17 || 15.2 || .514 || – || .667 || 3.7 || .3 || .3 || .8 || 4.4
|-
| style="text-align:left;"| 2018–19
| style="text-align:left;"| UConn
| 33 || 33 || 22.2 || .607 || – || .627 || 6.2 || .4 || .4 || 1.8 || 9.0
|-
| style="text-align:left;"| 2019–20
| style="text-align:left;"| UConn
| 31 || 31 || 21.3 || .502 || – || .500 || 6.1 || .7 || .4 || 1.1 || 7.8
|-
| style="text-align:left;"| 2020–21
| style="text-align:left;"| UConn
| 19 || 1 || 11.3 || .482 || – || .591 || 3.7 || .4 || .4 || .4 || 3.5
|-
| style="text-align:left;"| 2021–22
| style="text-align:left;"| Houston
| 38 || 28 || 21.7 || .626 || 1.000 || .579 || 6.2 || .8 || .5 || 1.2 || 11.6
|- class="sortbottom"
| style="text-align:center;" colspan="2"| Career
| 153 || 110 || 18.2 || .567 || 1.000 || .590 || 5.3 || .5 || .4 || 1.1 || 7.8

References

External links
Houston Cougars bio
UConn Huskies bio

1999 births
Living people
American men's basketball players
Basketball players from Maryland
Centers (basketball)
DeMatha Catholic High School alumni
Le Mans Sarthe Basket players
Houston Cougars men's basketball players
People from Silver Spring, Maryland
Power forwards (basketball)
UConn Huskies men's basketball players